Pluwig is a municipality in the Trier-Saarburg district, in Rhineland-Palatinate, Germany. It belongs to the Verbandsgemeinde Ruwer.

Geography 
Pluwig is close to Gusterath, Ollmuth and Franzenheim. 

Districts are Pluwig, Wilzenburg, Willmerich, Geizenburg and Pluwigerhammer with the former railway station of Pluwig.

Flowig waters, which belong to Pluwig, are the left inflows of the Ruwer: the Gusterather Waschbach, the Wilzenburger Waschbach and the Geizenburger Waschbach.

History

Population Growth 
The development of the population is based on censuses:

References
 

Municipalities in Rhineland-Palatinate
Trier-Saarburg